Svend Pri (earlier Svend Andersen; March 18, 1945 – June 8, 1983) was a Danish badminton player who won numerous major titles from the mid-1960s through the mid-1970s.

Career
His play was marked by great power, tenacity, and tactical astuteness. Pri competed in badminton at the 1972 Summer Olympics, where badminton was played as a demonstration sport. In men's singles he was defeated in the final by Rudy Hartono 15-6, 15-1. In mixed doubles he played together with Ulla Strand and they were beaten in the final by Derek Talbot and Gillian Gilks 15-6, 18-16. An excellent three event (singles, doubles, mixed doubles) player, the high points of his career were probably two dramatic singles victories over the iconic Rudy Hartono, one in the Challenge Round of Thomas Cup (Denmark v. Indonesia) in 1973, the other in the final of the All-Englands in 1975. He won a silver medal in the 1977 IBF World Championships in men's singles, losing against Flemming Delfs in the final 15-5, 15-6.

Death
Experiencing personal difficulty in coping with family and financial problems in the wake of his badminton career, Pri killed himself in June 1983 at the age of 38.

Achievements

Olympic Games (demonstration) 
Men's singles

World Championships 
Men's singles

European Championships 
Men's singles

International tournaments 

Men's singles

Men's doubles

Mixed doubles

References

External links
Svend Pri's Profile - Badminton.dk

1945 births
1983 deaths
Danish male badminton players
Badminton players at the 1972 Summer Olympics
1983 suicides
Suicides in Denmark
Sportspeople from Copenhagen